Eunidia thomensis is a species of beetle in the family Cerambycidae. It was described by Stephan von Breuning in 1970. It occurs in the island of São Tomé.

References

Eunidiini
Fauna of São Tomé Island
Insects of São Tomé and Príncipe
Beetles described in 1970